Route 283 was a short highway in the Kansas City, Missouri regional area.  Its northern terminus was at Interstate 29 (I-29) and U.S. Route 71 (US 71) in Kansas City; its southern terminus was at Route 9 at the northern city limit of North Kansas City. It was known locally as North Oak Trafficway.

Route description
Route 283 began at a fork from Route 9 northbound (Burlington Avenue) in North Kansas City. The two routes forked away from one another, with Route 283, the North Oak Trafficway, crossing Northwest 32nd Avenue as a four-lane divided highway. North of Northwest 32nd, Route 283's four lanes came back together and bent northward over a creek as it entered Water Works Park along the southbound side. The route headed due north, becoming commercial northbound and residential southbound. This changed to a long commercial district in Kansas City before intersecting with Northeast Briarcliff Road/Northeast 42nd Street. At that point, the four-lane highway returned to a mixed residential/business stretch until Northeast 46th Street. After Northeast 46th, Route 283 entered an interchange with I-29 and US 71, where the designation terminated at ramps just south of US 69 (Northeast Vivion Road) and Anita B. Gorman Park.

Junction list

References

External links

Missouri Road Photo Gallery

283
Transportation in Clay County, Missouri
Transportation in Kansas City, Missouri
Former state highways in Missouri